The 81st Assembly District of Wisconsin is one of 99 districts in the Wisconsin State Assembly.  Located in south-central Wisconsin, the district comprises the northwest corner of Dane County, and parts of western Columbia County, eastern Iowa County, and eastern Sauk County.  It includes the city of Baraboo, and the villages of Arena, Black Earth, Blue Mounds, Mazomanie, Prairie du Sac, Ridgeway, Sauk City, and West Baraboo.  The district also contains Devil's Lake State Park and Blue Mound State Park.  The district is represented by Democrat Dave Considine, since January 2015.

The 81st Assembly District is located within Wisconsin's 27th Senate district, along with the 79th and 80th Assembly districts.

List of past representatives

References 

Wisconsin State Assembly districts
Columbia County, Wisconsin
Dane County, Wisconsin
Iowa County, Wisconsin
Sauk County, Wisconsin